The 1985–86 season was Manchester United's 84th season in the Football League, and their 11th consecutive season in the top division of English football.

Despite having won the FA Cup the previous season, the team was unable to compete in the 1985–86 European Cup Winners' Cup due to the five-year ban on English clubs competing in European competitions that was imposed following the Heysel Stadium disaster at the 1985 European Cup Final. Instead, the clubs who would have qualified for Europe all competed in the Football League Super Cup.

With no European action to distract them, they got off to a 10-match winning start in the league. They were unbeaten from their first 15 games with 41 points as at 2 November with 13 wins and 2 draws. The size of their lead at that point helped them stay top of the league until the beginning of February despite taking only 35 points from their last 27 games finishing fourth in the league on 76 points, 12 points behind champions Liverpool. There was no success in the cup competitions to fall back on, leading to doubts about the future of Ron Atkinson as manager. He had completed five seasons as manager without them finishing outside the top four and had won two FA Cups, but the wait for a league title was now entering its 20th season. 

Media reports linked two managers with a move to Old Trafford: Terry Venables, who had just rejected an offer to return to England from Barcelona to take charge at Arsenal; and Alex Ferguson, whose Aberdeen side had broken the Old Firm dominance of Celtic and Rangers in recent seasons. Despite this speculation, Atkinson remained in charge of United into the following season, but the pressure on him to deliver success to the club remained intense.

The ban on English clubs in European competitions was extended to a second season, meaning that United would not be able to compete in the 1986–87 UEFA Cup.

Mark Hughes was once again United's top scorer, scoring 17 goals in the league and 18 in all competitions. However, he was less prolific during the second half of the season after scoring 11 times before Christmas, and on 21 March 1986 it was announced that he would be leaving United at the end of the season to sign for FC Barcelona of Spain in a £2million deal. United had already signed Nottingham Forest striker Peter Davenport as his successor. United had signed another striker, Terry Gibson from Coventry City, just after the turn of the new year.

United's title challenge was also not helped by the fact that captain Bryan Robson was only available for half of the club's league games this season due to injuries.

FA Charity Shield

First Division

FA Cup

Football League Cup

Football League Super Cup

Pld = Matches played; W = Matches won; D = Matches drawn; L = Matches lost; GF = Goals for; GA = Goals against; GD = Goal difference; Pts = Points

Squad statistics

References

Manchester United F.C. seasons
Manchester United